Triathlon is an event at the Island Games, the biennial multi-sports event for island nations, territories and dependencies.  Men's and Women's triathlon was included on the itinerary for the first time in the Isle of Man, in 2001. Not every games has included a triathlon competition.

One Standard Distance Race 
 Swimming 1500m 
 Cycling	40 km 
 Non-Drafting Running	10 km
One Relay Race (Optional) - Swimming 400m - Cycling 6 km - Non-Drafting Running 1.5 km

Events

Top medalists

Men's tournament

Women's tournament

Men's team

Women's team

References 

 
Sports at the Island Games
Island Games